"How They Remember You" is a song written by Marc Beeson, Josh Osborne, and Allen Shamblin, and recorded by American country music group Rascal Flatts. It is the lone single from their 2020 extended play of the same name. This was the last single the group released in their career before their breakup in October 2021.

History
Marc Beeson, Josh Osborne, and Allen Shamblin wrote the song. According to group member Jay DeMarcus, the song is "a timeless message that will inspire people, and it's about what kind of mark you leave behind when you leave this world". Shamblin had previously written the band's 2009 single "Why".

On July 30, 2020, Rascal Flatts released a digital extended play which included "How They Remember You", a cover of Kenny Rogers' 1981 hit "Through the Years", and five other cuts. The group also released a lyric video that same month, featuring footage that was submitted by fans.

In May 2021, the song became the group's final top ten and top five hit on Billboard Country Airplay.

Charts

Weekly charts

Year-end charts

References

2020 songs
2020 singles
Rascal Flatts songs
Songs written by Marc Beeson
Songs written by Josh Osborne
Songs written by Allen Shamblin
Song recordings produced by Dann Huff
Big Machine Records singles